Hale Valley is the northernmost of three largely ice-free valleys that trend east from Midnight Plateau in the Darwin Mountains of Antarctica. This valley is immediately south of Kennett Ridge. It was named after Mason E. Hale, a lichenologist at the National Museum of Natural History (Smithsonian), Washington, D.C., who worked about six austral summers in the McMurdo Dry Valleys beginning around 1980.

References

Valleys of Oates Land